
The Rev. M.L. Latta House was a historic home located in the Oberlin neighborhood of Raleigh, North Carolina. It was the last remaining building from Latta University, a trade school for African Americans that operated from 1892 until 1920. The house was named after Morgan London Latta, a freedman and former slave who graduated from Shaw University after the Civil War. It was built about 1905, and was a substantial, two-story Queen Anne style residence with a Tuscan order wraparound porch.  He founded Latta University to educate freedmen and orphans in Raleigh's African-American community and built the campus next to his house. His house was listed on the National Register of Historic Places in 2002, and designated a Raleigh Historic Landmark.

On January 8, 2007, a fire destroyed the house, leaving only the manmade brick foundation. Before the fire, plans had been made by The Latta House Foundation to adapt the house as a cultural center. After the fire, the property owner gave the land to the city of Raleigh for use as a park.

Images

See also
List of Registered Historic Places in North Carolina

References

External links
 Latta House Foundation
M.L. Latta's autobiography

Houses on the National Register of Historic Places in North Carolina
Houses completed in 1905
Queen Anne architecture in North Carolina
Colonial Revival architecture in North Carolina
African-American history in Raleigh, North Carolina
Historically black universities and colleges in the United States
National Register of Historic Places in Raleigh, North Carolina
Houses in Raleigh, North Carolina
Burned houses in the United States
1905 establishments in North Carolina